The Rolling Stones' 1965 Far East Tour was the first concert tour of Oceania by the band. The tour commenced on 22 January and concluded on 16 February 1965.

This series of concerts was a package tour with Roy Orbison, The Newbeats, and Ray Columbus & the Invaders, and was promoted by Harry M. Miller. In Australia, there were different local support acts in each city.

Parts of the Sydney leg of the tour were filmed by Movietone News and screened in cinemas. Footage in Stones Roll Down Under included their arrival at Sydney Airport, part of the airport press conference and part of the performance of "Not Fade Away" from their first Sydney show.

The Rolling Stones 
 Mick Jagger - lead vocals, harmonica, percussion
 Keith Richards - guitar, backing vocals
 Brian Jones - guitar, harmonica, backing vocals
 Bill Wyman - bass guitar, backing vocals
 Charlie Watts - drums

Tour set list
"Not Fade Away"
"Walking The Dog"
"Under The Boardwalk"
"Little Red Rooster"
"Around and Around
"Heart of Stone"
"Time Is On My Side"
"It's All Over Now"

Tour dates 
 22 January 1965 Sydney, Australia, Manufacturer's Auditorium, Agricultural Hall (2 shows)
 23 January 1965 Sydney, Australia, Manufacturer's Auditorium, Agricultural Hall (3 shows)
 25 January 1965 Brisbane, Australia, City Hall (2 shows)
 26 January 1965 Brisbane, Australia, City Hall (2 shows)
 27 January 1965 Sydney, Australia, Manufacturer's Auditorium, Agricultural Hall (2 shows)
 28 January 1965 St. Kilda, Australia, Palais Theatre (2 shows)
 29 January 1965 St. Kilda, Australia, Palais Theatre (3 shows)
 1 February 1965 Christchurch, New Zealand, Theatre Royal (2 shows)
 2 February 1965 Invercargill, New Zealand, Civic Theatre (2 shows)
 3 February 1965 Dunedin, New Zealand, Town Hall (2 shows)
 6 February 1965 Auckland, New Zealand, Town Hall (2 shows)
 8 February 1965 Wellington, New Zealand, Town Hall (2 shows)
 10 February 1965 St. Kilda, Australia, Palais Theatre (2 shows)
 11 February 1965 Adelaide, Australia, Centennial Hall (2 shows)
 13 February 1965 Perth, Australia, Capitol Theatre (3 shows)
 16 February 1965 Singapore Badminton Stadium (2 shows)

References 
 Carr, Roy.  The Rolling Stones: An Illustrated Record.  Harmony Books, 1976.  

The Rolling Stones concert tours
1965 concert tours
1965 in Oceania
Roy Orbison
Concert tours of Australia
Concert tours of New Zealand